Taylor Gayle Rutherfurd (born June 10, 2004), better known by her mononym Gayle (stylized in all capitals),  is an American singer. After signing with Atlantic Records/Arthouse Records, she released her hit single "ABCDEFU" in 2021, which has charted worldwide, including reaching number one in the United Kingdom, Ireland, and on the Billboard Global 200 and earned her a Grammy nomination for Song of the Year.

Early life
Rutherfurd is from Plano, Texas. She started singing when she was seven and eventually moved to Nashville, Tennessee to pursue a musical career. She is dyslexic.

Career
In 2020, she signed her first record with Arthouse Records.

After releasing several self-produced singles, Gayle was discovered by former American Idol judge and Arthouse music publisher Kara DioGuardi and was signed to Atlantic Records/Arthouse Records.

In 2021, Gayle released "ABCDEFU", her major-label debut single with Atlantic Records/Arthouse Records. It became viral on TikTok and Spotify. "ABCDEFU" peaked at number three on the Billboard Hot 100. Outside of the United States, "ABCDEFU" topped the charts in Finland, Germany, Ireland, Norway, Sweden, and the United Kingdom, and the top ten in Australia, Austria, New Zealand, and Switzerland. Gayle subsequently released the song "Ur Just Horny" on January 19, 2022. On March 18, 2022, Gayle released a six-song  extended play (EP) titled A Study of the Human Experience Volume One via Atlantic Records and Arthouse Records.

On March 19, 2022, Gayle was a fill-in host for the CHR version of Ryan Seacrest's American Top 40, where her song "ABCDEFU" spent its first week at number one.

On September 19, 2022, Gayle announced that she was canceling her ‘Avoiding College’ Tour.

On October 7, 2022, Gayle released her second extended play, A Study of the Human Experience Volume Two.

On December 9, 2022, Gayle released a third extended play, A Study of the Human Experience Volume Two and a Half. Rather than new bodies of music, the EP consists of eight new versions of songs from her previous two extended plays.

Gayle will be an opening act on multiple shows of the US leg of Taylor Swift's upcoming The Eras Tour, and on the European leg of Pink's Pink Summer Carnival tour.

Tours
Supporting
 The Eras Tour (2023) with Taylor Swift
 Pink Summer Carnival (2023) with Pink

Discography

Extended plays

Singles

As lead artist

As featured artist

Awards and nominations

Notes

References

External links 

 

2004 births
21st-century American women singers
21st-century American singers
American child singers
Atlantic Records artists
People from Dallas
Living people
Musicians from Dallas
American people of Scottish descent
American alternative rock musicians
Pop punk singers
Musicians with dyslexia
Power pop musicians
American pop rock singers